John Patrick Hartigan (December 29, 1887 – August 10, 1968) was Attorney General of Rhode Island, a United States district judge of the United States District Court for the District of Rhode Island and a United States Circuit Judge of the United States Court of Appeals for the First Circuit.

Education and career

Born in Providence, Rhode Island, Hartigan attended Harvard University, then received an Artium Baccalaureus degree from Brown University in 1910. He received an Artium Magister degree from Columbia University in 1913 and received a Bachelor of Laws from Columbia Law School the same year. He was in private practice of law in Providence from 1912 to 1933. He was in the United States Army as a Second Lieutenant during World War I from 1917 to 1918 in the 304th Infantry Regiment. He was an Assistant Attorney General of Rhode Island from 1923 to 1924 and served as the 59th Attorney General of Rhode Island from 1933 to 1939.

Federal judicial service

Hartigan was nominated by President Franklin D. Roosevelt on January 11, 1940, to a seat on the United States District Court for the District of Rhode Island vacated by Judge John Christopher Mahoney. He was confirmed by the United States Senate on February 1, 1940, and received his commission on February 12, 1940. His service was terminated on January 13, 1951, due to his elevation to the First Circuit.

Hartigan was nominated by President Harry S. Truman on December 21, 1950, to a seat on the United States Court of Appeals for the First Circuit vacated by Judge John Christopher Mahoney. He was confirmed by the Senate on January 2, 1951, and received his commission on January 3, 1951. He assumed senior status on March 31, 1965. His service was terminated on August 10, 1968, due to his death.

References

External links
 
 

1887 births
1968 deaths
Judges of the United States District Court for the District of Rhode Island
United States district court judges appointed by Franklin D. Roosevelt
20th-century American judges
Judges of the United States Court of Appeals for the First Circuit
United States court of appeals judges appointed by Harry S. Truman
Politicians from Providence, Rhode Island
Military personnel from Rhode Island
Harvard University alumni
Brown University alumni
Rhode Island Attorneys General
Columbia Law School alumni